François Yabré Tobasegnou (born 10 May 1991) is a Burkinabé international footballer who plays as a defender for Romanian Liga II side Oțelul Galați.

Club career
Yabré has played club football for Mjøndalen, Strømmen and Kongsvinger. Ahead of the 2016 season he went on to HamKam. In 2018 he signed for FK Mjølner. He left the club again at the end of the year. He then played for Romanian club Luceafărul Oradea, signing for them in 2019, and leaving the club in 2020.

In August 2020 he signed for Aerostar Bacău. Later that season he moved to Oțelul Galați.

International career
He made his international debut for Burkina Faso in 2013, his only cap to date.

References

1991 births
Living people
Burkinabé footballers
Burkina Faso international footballers
Association football defenders
Norwegian First Division players
Mjøndalen IF players
Strømmen IF players
Norwegian Second Division players
Kongsvinger IL Toppfotball players
Hamarkameratene players
FK Mjølner players
Liga II players
CS Luceafărul Oradea players
ACS Viitorul Târgu Jiu players
CS Aerostar Bacău players
Liga III players
ASC Oțelul Galați players
Burkinabé expatriate footballers
Burkinabé expatriate sportspeople in Norway
Expatriate footballers in Norway
Burkinabé expatriate sportspeople in Romania
Expatriate footballers in Romania
21st-century Burkinabé people